Thorium-based nuclear power generation is fueled primarily by the nuclear fission of the isotope uranium-233 produced from the fertile element thorium. A thorium fuel cycle can offer several potential advantages over a uranium fuel cycle—including the much greater abundance of thorium found on Earth, superior physical and nuclear fuel properties, and reduced nuclear waste production. One advantage of thorium fuel is its low weaponization potential; it is difficult to weaponize the uranium-233/232 and plutonium-238 isotopes that are largely consumed in thorium reactors. 

After studying the feasibility of using thorium, nuclear scientists Ralph W. Moir and Edward Teller suggested that thorium nuclear research should be restarted after a three-decade shutdown and that a small prototype plant should be built.

Advocates believe thorium is key to developing a new generation of cleaner, safer nuclear power. In 2011, a group of scientists at the Georgia Institute of Technology assessed thorium-based power as "a 1000+ year solution or a quality low-carbon bridge to truly sustainable energy sources solving a huge portion of mankind's negative environmental impact." However, development of thorium power has significant start-up costs. Development of breeder reactors in general (including thorium reactors, which are breeders by nature) will increase proliferation concerns.

History

After World War II, uranium-based nuclear reactors were built to produce electricity. These were similar to the reactor designs that produced material for nuclear weapons.  During that period, the government of the United States also built an experimental prototype molten salt reactor (MSR) using U-233 fuel, the fissile material created by bombarding thorium with neutrons. The MSRE reactor, built at Oak Ridge National Laboratory, operated critical for roughly 15,000 hours from 1965 to 1969. In 1968, Nobel laureate and discoverer of plutonium, Glenn Seaborg, publicly announced to the Atomic Energy Commission, of which he was chairman, that the thorium-based reactor had been successfully developed and tested.

In 1973, however, the US government settled on uranium technology and largely discontinued thorium-related nuclear research. The reasons were that uranium-fueled reactors were more efficient, the research was proven, and thorium's breeding ratio was thought insufficient to produce enough fuel to support development of a commercial nuclear industry.  As Moir and Teller later wrote, "The competition came down to a liquid metal fast breeder reactor (LMFBR) on the uranium-plutonium cycle and a thermal reactor on the thorium-233U cycle, the molten salt breeder reactor. The LMFBR had a larger breeding rate ... and won the competition."  In their opinion, the decision to stop development of thorium reactors, at least as a backup option, "was an excusable mistake".

Science writer Richard Martin states that nuclear physicist Alvin Weinberg, who was director at Oak Ridge and primarily responsible for the new reactor, lost his job as director because he championed development of the safer thorium reactors. Weinberg himself recalls this period:

Martin explains that Weinberg's unwillingness to sacrifice potentially safe nuclear power for the benefit of military uses forced him to retire:

Despite the documented history of thorium nuclear power, many of today's nuclear experts were nonetheless unaware of it. According to Chemical & Engineering News, "most people—including scientists—have hardly heard of the heavy-metal element and know little about it", noting a comment by a conference attendee that "it's possible to have a Ph.D. in nuclear reactor technology and not know about thorium energy." Nuclear physicist Victor J. Stenger, for one, first learned of it in 2012:

Others, including former NASA scientist and thorium expert Kirk Sorensen, agree that "thorium was the alternative path that was not taken". According to Sorensen, during a documentary interview, he states that if the US had not discontinued its research in 1974 it could have "probably achieved energy independence by around 2000". On 18 May 2022 US Senate bill S.4242 – "A bill to provide for the preservation and storage of uranium-233 to foster development of thorium molten-salt reactors", the 'Thorium Energy Security Act' was introduced for the first time. Sorensen had urged this measure since 2006.

Benefits
 Abundance. Thorium is three times as abundant as uranium and nearly as abundant as lead and gallium in the Earth's crust. The Thorium Energy Alliance estimates "there is enough thorium in the United States alone to power the country at its current energy level for over 1,000 years." "America has buried tons as a by-product of rare earth metals mining", notes Evans-Pritchard. Almost all thorium is fertile Th-232, compared to uranium that is composed of 99.3% fertile U-238 and 0.7% more valuable fissile U-235.
 Not suitable for bombs. It is difficult to make a practical nuclear bomb from a thorium reactor's by-products. Thorium is not fissile like uranium, so packed thorium nuclei will not begin to split apart and explode. According to Alvin Radkowsky, designer of the world's first full-scale atomic electric power plant, "a thorium reactor's plutonium production rate would be less than 2 percent of that of a standard reactor, and the plutonium's isotopic content would make it unsuitable for a nuclear detonation."  Several uranium-233 bombs have been tested, but the presence of uranium-232 tended to "poison" the uranium-233 in two ways: intense radiation from the uranium-232 made the material difficult to handle, and the uranium-232 led to possible pre-detonation. Separating the uranium-232 from the uranium-233 proved very difficult, although newer laser isotope separation techniques could facilitate that process.
 Less nuclear waste. There is much less nuclear waste when thorium is used as a fuel in a liquid fluoride thorium reactor—up to two orders of magnitude less, state Moir and Teller, eliminating the need for large-scale or long-term storage; "Chinese scientists claim that hazardous waste will be a thousand times less than with uranium." The radioactivity of the resulting waste also drops down to safe levels after just one or a few hundred years, compared to tens of thousands of years needed for current nuclear waste to cool off. Especially the production of minor actinides as well as of undesirable isotopes of uranium (particularly uranium-236 in conventional uranium powered light water reactors) and isotopes of plutonium (particularly plutonium-240) which are fertile for thermal neutrons but which produce significant amounts of decay heat and which are radiological hazards over thousands or even tens of thousands of years. However, the production of activation products and fission products is broadly similar between thorium and uranium based fuel cycles.
 Fewer reaction startup ingredients. According to Moir and Teller, "once started up [, a breeding reactor] needs no other fuel except thorium because [a breeding reactor] makes most or all of its own fuel." Breeding reactors produce at least as much fissile material as they consume. Non-breeding reactors, on the other hand, require additional fissile material, such as uranium-235 or plutonium to sustain the reaction.
 Harvesting weapons-grade plutonium. The thorium fuel cycle is a potential way to produce long term nuclear energy with low radio-toxicity waste. In addition, the transition to thorium could be done through the incineration of weapons grade plutonium (WPu) or civilian plutonium.
 No enrichment necessary. Since all natural thorium can be used as fuel, no expensive fuel enrichment is needed. However the same is true for U-238, as fertile fuel in the uranium-plutonium cycle.
 Efficiency. Comparing the amount of thorium needed with coal, Nobel laureate Carlo Rubbia of CERN (European Organization for Nuclear Research), estimates that one ton of thorium can produce as much energy as 200 tons of uranium, or 3,500,000 tons of coal.
 Failsafe measures. Liquid fluoride thorium reactors are designed to be meltdown proof. A fusible plug at the bottom of the reactor melts in the event of a power failure or if temperatures exceed a set limit, draining the fuel into an underground tank for safe storage.
 Mining. Mining thorium is safer and more efficient than mining uranium. Thorium's ore, monazite, generally contains higher concentrations of thorium than the percentage of uranium found in its respective ore. This makes thorium a more cost efficient and less environmentally damaging fuel source. Thorium mining is also easier and less dangerous than uranium mining, as the mine is an open pit—which requires no ventilation, unlike underground uranium mines, where radon levels can be potentially harmful.

Summarizing some of the potential benefits, Martin offers his general opinion: "Thorium could provide a clean and effectively limitless source of power while allaying all public concern—weapons proliferation, radioactive pollution, toxic waste, and fuel that is both costly and complicated to process." Moir and Teller estimated in 2004 that the cost for their recommended prototype would be "well under $1 billion with operation costs likely on the order of $100 million per year", and as a result a "large-scale nuclear power plan" usable by many countries could be set up within a decade.

Disadvantages
Some experts note possible specific disadvantages of thorium nuclear power:
 Breeding in a thermal neutron spectrum is slow and requires extensive reprocessing. The feasibility of reprocessing is still unverified.
 Significant and expensive testing, analysis and licensing work would be required, requiring business and government support. In a 2012 report on the use of thorium fuel with existing water-cooled reactors, the Bulletin of the Atomic Scientists suggested that it would "require too great an investment and provide no clear payoff", and that "from the utilities' point of view, the only legitimate driver capable of motivating pursuit of thorium is economics".
 Fabrication and reprocessing is higher cost than using traditional solid fuel rods.
 Thorium, when irradiated for use in reactors, makes uranium-232, which emits gamma rays. This irradiation process may be altered slightly by removing protactinium-233. The decay of the protactinium-233 would then create uranium-233 in lieu of uranium-232 for use in nuclear weapons—making thorium into a dual purpose fuel.

Proponents 
Nobel laureate in physics and former director of CERN Carlo Rubbia has long been a fan of thorium. According to Rubbia, "In order to be vigorously continued, nuclear power must be profoundly modified".

Hans Blix, former director general of the International Atomic Energy Agency, has said "Thorium fuel gives rise to waste that is smaller in volume, less toxic and much less long lived than the wastes that result from uranium fuel".

Power projects 

Research and development of thorium-based nuclear reactors, primarily the liquid fluoride thorium reactor (LFTR), MSR design, has been or is now being done in the United States, United Kingdom, Germany, Brazil, India, Indonesia, China, France, the Czech Republic, Japan, Russia, Canada, Israel, Denmark and the Netherlands. Conferences with experts from as many as 32 countries are held, including one by the European Organization for Nuclear Research (CERN) in 2013, which focuses on thorium as an alternative nuclear technology without requiring production of nuclear waste. Recognized experts, such as Hans Blix, former head of the International Atomic Energy Agency, calls for expanded support of new nuclear power technology, and states, "the thorium option offers the world not only a new sustainable supply of fuel for nuclear power but also one that makes better use of the fuel's energy content."

Canada
CANDU reactors are capable of using thorium, and Thorium Power Canada has, in 2013, planned and proposed developing thorium power projects for Chile and Indonesia. The proposed 10 MW demonstration reactor in Chile could be used to power a 20 million litre/day desalination plant. In 2018, the New Brunswick Energy Solutions Corporation announced the participation of Moltex Energy in the nuclear research cluster that will work on research and development on small modular reactor technology.

China
At the 2011 annual conference of the Chinese Academy of Sciences, it was announced that "China has initiated a research and development project in thorium MSR technology." In addition, Dr. Jiang Mianheng, son of China's former leader Jiang Zemin, led a thorium delegation in non-disclosure talks at Oak Ridge National Laboratory, Tennessee, and by late 2013 China had officially partnered with Oak Ridge to aid China in its own development. The World Nuclear Association notes that the China Academy of Sciences in January 2011 announced its R&D program, "claiming to have the world's largest national effort on it, hoping to obtain full intellectual property rights on the technology." According to Martin, "China has made clear its intention to go it alone," adding that China already has a monopoly over most of the world's rare earth minerals.

In March 2014, with their reliance on coal-fired power having become a major cause of their current "smog crisis", they reduced their original goal of creating a working reactor from 25 years down to 10. "In the past, the government was interested in nuclear power because of the energy shortage. Now they are more interested because of smog", said Professor Li Zhong, a scientist working on the project. "This is definitely a race", he added.

In early 2012, it was reported that China, using components produced by the West and Russia, planned to build two prototypes, one of them a molten salt-cooled pebble-bed reactor by 2015, and a research molten salt reactor by 2017, had budgeted the project at $400 million and requiring 400 workers. China also finalized an agreement with a Canadian nuclear technology company to develop improved CANDU reactors using thorium and uranium as a fuel.
By 2019 two of the reactors were under construction in the Gobi desert, with completion expected around 2025. China expects to put thorium reactors into commercial use by 2030. At least one of the 2 MW thorium prototypes, either a molten salt reactor, or a molten salt-cooled reactor, is nearing completion, with startup in September 2021.  

See TMSR-LF1

As of 24 June 2021, China has reported that the Gobi molten salt reactor will be completed on schedule with tests beginning as early as September 2021. The new reactor is a part of Chinese leader Xi Jinping's drive to make China carbon-neutral by 2060. China hopes to complete the world's first commercial thorium reactor by 2030 and has planned to further build more thorium power plants across the low populated deserts and plains of western China, as well as up to 30 nations involved in China's Belt and Road Initiative. In August 2022, the Chinese Ministry of Ecology and Environment informed the Shanghai Institute of Applied Physics (SINAP) that its commissioning plan for the LF1 had been approved.

Germany, 1980s
The German THTR-300 was a prototype commercial power station using thorium as fertile and highly enriched U-235 as fissile fuel. Though named thorium high temperature reactor, mostly U-235 was fissioned. The THTR-300 was a helium-cooled high-temperature reactor with a pebble-bed reactor core consisting of approximately 670,000 spherical fuel compacts each 6 centimetres (2.4 in) in diameter with particles of uranium-235 and thorium-232 fuel embedded in a graphite matrix.
It fed power to Germany's grid for 432 days in the late 1980s, before it was shut down for cost, mechanical and other reasons.

India
India has the largest supplies of thorium in the world, with comparatively poor quantities of uranium. India has projected meeting as much as 30% of its electrical demands through thorium by 2050.

In February 2014, Bhabha Atomic Research Centre (BARC), in Mumbai, India, presented their latest design for a "next-generation nuclear reactor" that burns thorium as its fuel ore, calling it the Advanced Heavy Water Reactor (AHWR). They estimated the reactor could function without an operator for 120 days. Validation of its core reactor physics was underway by late 2017.

According to Dr R K Sinha, chairman of their Atomic Energy Commission, "This will reduce our dependence on fossil fuels, mostly imported, and will be a major contribution to global efforts to combat climate change." Because of its inherent safety, they expect that similar designs could be set up "within" populated cities, like Mumbai or Delhi.

Indian government is also developing up to 62 reactors, mostly thorium-based, which it expects to be operational by 2025. India is the "only country in the world with a detailed, funded, government-approved plan" to focus on thorium-based nuclear power. The country currently gets under 2% of its electricity from nuclear power, with the rest coming from coal (60%), hydroelectricity (16%), other renewable sources (12%) and natural gas (9%). It expects to produce around 25% of its electricity from nuclear power. In 2009 the chairman of the Indian Atomic Energy Commission said that India has a "long-term objective goal of becoming energy-independent based on its vast thorium resources to meet India's economic ambitions."

In late June 2012, India announced that their "first commercial fast reactor" was near completion, making India the most advanced country in thorium research. "We have huge reserves of thorium. The challenge is to develop technology for converting this to fissile material," stated their former Chairman of India's Atomic Energy Commission. That vision of using thorium in place of uranium was set out in the 1950s by physicist Homi Bhabha. India's first commercial fast breeder reactor—the 500 MWe Prototype Fast Breeder Reactor (PFBR)—is approaching completion at the Indira Gandhi Centre for Atomic Research, Kalpakkam, Tamil Nadu.

As of July 2013 the major equipment of the PFBR had been erected and the loading of "dummy" fuels in peripheral locations was in progress. The reactor was expected to go critical by September 2014. The Centre had sanctioned Rs. 5,677 crore for building the PFBR and "we will definitely build the reactor within that amount," Mr. Kumar asserted. The original cost of the project was Rs. 3,492 crore, revised to Rs. 5,677 crore. Electricity generated from the PFBR would be sold to the State Electricity Boards at Rs. 4.44 a unit. BHAVINI builds breeder reactors in India.

In 2013 India's 300 MWe AHWR (pressurized heavy water reactor) was slated to be built at an undisclosed location. The design envisages a start up with reactor grade plutonium that breeds U-233 from Th-232. Thereafter, thorium is to be the only fuel. As of 2017, the design was in the final stages of validation.

Delays have since postponed the commissioning [criticality?] of the PFBR to September 2016, but India's commitment to long-term nuclear energy production is underscored by the approval in 2015 of ten new sites for reactors of unspecified types, though procurement of primary fissile material—preferably plutonium—may be problematic due to India's low uranium reserves and capacity for production.

Indonesia

P3Tek, an agency of the Indonesia Ministry of Energy and Mineral Resource, has reviewed a thorium molten salt reactor by Thorcon called the TMSR-500. The study reported that building a ThorCon TMSR-500 would meet Indonesia's regulations for nuclear energy safety and performance.

Israel
In May 2010, researchers from Ben-Gurion University of the Negev in Israel and Brookhaven National Laboratory in New York began to collaborate on the development of thorium reactors, aimed at being self-sustaining, "meaning one that will produce and consume about the same amounts of fuel," which is not possible with uranium in a light water reactor.

Japan
In June 2012, Japan utility Chubu Electric Power wrote that they regard thorium as "one of future possible energy resources".

Norway
In late 2012, Norway's privately owned Thor Energy, in collaboration with the government and Westinghouse, announced a four-year trial using thorium in an existing nuclear reactor. In 2013, Aker Solutions purchased patents from Nobel Prize winning physicist Carlo Rubbia for the design of a proton accelerator-based thorium nuclear power plant.

United Kingdom
In Britain, one organisation promoting or examining research on thorium-based nuclear plants is The Alvin Weinberg Foundation. House of Lords member Bryony Worthington is promoting thorium, calling it "the forgotten fuel" that could alter Britain's energy plans. However, in 2010, the UK's National Nuclear Laboratory (NNL) concluded that for the short to medium term, "...the thorium fuel cycle does not currently have a role to play," in that it is "technically immature, and would require a significant financial investment and risk without clear benefits," and concluded that the benefits have been "overstated." Friends of the Earth UK considers research into it as "useful" as a fallback option.

United States
In its January 2012 report to the United States Secretary of Energy, the Blue Ribbon Commission on America's Future notes that a "molten-salt reactor using thorium [has] also been proposed". That same month it was reported that the US Department of Energy is "quietly collaborating with China" on thorium-based nuclear power designs using an MSR.

Some experts and politicians want thorium to be "the pillar of the U.S. nuclear future". Then-Senators Harry Reid and Orrin Hatch supported using $250 million in federal research funds to revive ORNL research. In 2009, Congressman Joe Sestak unsuccessfully attempted to secure funding for research and development of a destroyer-sized reactor [reactor of a size to power a destroyer] using thorium-based liquid fuel.

Alvin Radkowsky, chief designer of the world's second full-scale atomic electric power plant in Shippingport, Pennsylvania, founded a joint US and Russian project in 1997 to create a thorium-based reactor, considered a "creative breakthrough". In 1992, while a resident professor in Tel Aviv, Israel, he founded the US company, Thorium Power Ltd., near Washington, D.C., to build thorium reactors.

The primary fuel of the proposed HT3R research project near Odessa, Texas, United States, will be ceramic-coated thorium beads. The reactor construction has not yet begun. Estimates to complete a reactor were originally set at ten years in 2006 (with a proposed operational date of 2015).

On the research potential of thorium-based nuclear power, Richard L. Garwin, winner of the Presidential Medal of Freedom, and Georges Charpak advise further study of the Energy amplifier in their book Megawatts and Megatons (2001), pp. 153–63.

Thorium sources 

Thorium is mostly found with the rare earth phosphate mineral, monazite, which contains up to about 12% thorium phosphate, but 6–7% on average. World monazite resources are estimated to be about 12 million tons, two-thirds of which are in heavy mineral sands deposits on the south and east coasts of India. There are substantial deposits in several other countries (see table "World thorium reserves"). Monazite is a good source of REEs (rare earth elements), but monazites are currently not economical to produce because the radioactive thorium that is produced as a byproduct would have to be stored indefinitely. However, if thorium-based power plants were adopted on a large-scale, virtually all the world's thorium requirements could be supplied simply by refining monazites for their more valuable REEs.

Another estimate of reasonably assured reserves (RAR) and estimated additional reserves (EAR) of thorium comes from OECD/NEA, Nuclear Energy, "Trends in Nuclear Fuel Cycle", Paris, France (2001). (see table "IAEA Estimates in tons")

The preceding figures are reserves and as such refer to the amount of thorium in high-concentration deposits inventoried so far and estimated to be extractable at current market prices; millions of times more total exist in Earth's 3 tonne crust, around 120 trillion tons of thorium, and lesser but vast quantities of thorium exist at intermediate concentrations. Proved reserves are a good indicator of the total future supply of a mineral resource.

Reactor types
According to the World Nuclear Association, seven types of reactors can use thorium fuel. Six have entered into service at some point:
 Heavy water reactors (PHWRs)
 Advanced Heavy Water Reactor (AHWR)
 Aqueous Homogeneous Reactors (AHRs) have been proposed as a fluid fueled design that could accept naturally occurring uranium and thorium suspended in a heavy water solution. AHRs have been built and according to the IAEA reactor database, seven are currently in operation as research reactors.
 Boiling (light) water reactors (BWRs)
 Pressurized (light) water reactors (PWRs)
 Molten salt reactors (MSRs), including liquid fluoride thorium reactors (LFTRs). 
Molten salt breeder reactors, or MSBRs, use thorium to breed more fissile material.
 High-temperature gas-cooled reactors (HTRs)
 Fast neutron reactors (FNRs)
 Accelerator driven reactors (ADS)

See also
 Accelerator-driven subcritical reactor
 Generation IV reactor
 India's three-stage nuclear power programme
 List of countries by thorium resources

Notes

References

External links
 Thorium fuel cycle – Potential benefits and challenges, International Atomic Energy Agency
 International Thorium Energy Organisation – IThEO.org
 International Thorium Energy Committee – iThEC
 "Energy From Thorium: A Nuclear Waste Burning Liquid Salt Thorium Reactor", video, 1 hr. 22 min., Kirk Sorensen's presentation at Google's Tech Talk, 20 July 2009
 "Uranium Is So Last Century – Enter Thorium, the New Green Nuke" Wired Magazine article
 Thorium Energy Alliance – advocacy and educational organisation dedicated to thorium energy
 Energy from Thorium – website about LFTR
 International Thorium Molten-Salt Forum
 

Nuclear power
Nuclear reactors
Nuclear reactors by type
Thorium